Dennis Marshall may refer to:

Dennis Marshall (footballer, born 1959), Costa Rican football midfielder
Dennis Marshall (footballer, born 1985) (1985–2011), his son, Costa Rican football defender

See also
Denis Marshall (disambiguation)
Dennis Marschall (born 1996), German racing driver